Catherine Rose Biggs Dobbs (1908–1974) was the first woman mayor of a major industrial city, Barberton, Ohio, in the United States. Before running for mayor she was a noted historian and lecturer.

She was born in Shreve, Ohio. Studying journalism briefly at the University of Akron, she did not graduate.

In 1948, she became the first woman from the Akron area to hold a seat in the Ohio Senate. She was a Democrat, and served as mayor from 1956 to 1961.

In May 1962, she came in second behind Charles Babcock in the Democratic primary for Ohio Secretary of State.

Electoral history

References

External links
Biography at Akron Women's History
Profile on the Ohio Ladies' Gallery website

1908 births
1974 deaths
Mayors of places in Ohio
Women mayors of places in Ohio
Women state legislators in Ohio
People from Barberton, Ohio
20th-century American politicians
20th-century American women politicians
People from Shreve, Ohio